The Kerinci bent-toed gecko (Cyrtodactylus semicinctus) is a species of gecko that is endemic to Sumatra.

References 

Cyrtodactylus
Reptiles described in 2015